This is a list of Swedish television related events from 2009.

Events
27 March - Strongman Magnus Samuelsson and his partner Annika Sjöö win the fourth season of Let's Dance.
12 June - 30-year-old magician Charlie Caper wins the third season of Talang.
11 December - Erik Grönwall wins the sixth season of Idol.

Debuts

Television shows

2000s
Idol (2004-2011, 2013–present)
Let's Dance (2006–present)
Talang (2007-2011, 2014–present)
1–24 December - Superhjältejul

Ending this year

Births

Deaths

See also
2009 in Sweden

References